138th may refer to:

138th (Edmonton, Alberta) Battalion, CEF, a unit in the Canadian Expeditionary Force during the First World War
138th (Lincoln and Leicester) Brigade, infantry brigade of the British Army that saw active service in World War I
138th Aero Squadron, Air Service, United States Army unit that fought on the Western Front during World War I
138th Attack Squadron, unit of the New York Air National Guard 174th Attack Wing located at Hancock Field Air National Guard Base, Syracuse, New York
138th Brigade (People's Republic of China), one of the five maneuver elements of the 26th Group Army in the Jinan Military Region
138th Delaware General Assembly, meeting of the legislative branch of the state government, consisting of the Delaware Senate and House of Representatives
138th Field Artillery Brigade, field artillery (also known as fires) brigade of the United States Army
138th Fighter Wing, unit of the Oklahoma Air National Guard, stationed at the Tulsa International Airport, Tulsa, Oklahoma
138th Georgia General Assembly succeeded the 137th and served as the precedent for the 139th General Assembly in 1987
138th Guards Motor Rifle Brigade, a formation of the Russian Ground Forces
138th Illinois Volunteer Infantry Regiment, infantry regiment from Illinois that served in the Union Army during the American Civil War
138th Indiana Infantry Regiment served in the Union Army during the American Civil War
138th Infantry Regiment (United States), infantry battalion in the Missouri National Guard
138th meridian east, line of longitude across the Arctic Ocean, Asia, the Pacific Ocean, Australasia, the Indian Ocean, the Southern Ocean, and Antarctica
138th meridian west, line of longitude across the Arctic Ocean, North America, the Pacific Ocean, the Southern Ocean, and Antarctica
138th New York State Legislature
138th Ohio Infantry, an infantry regiment in the Union Army during the American Civil War
138th Pennsylvania Infantry, infantry regiment that served in the Union Army during the American Civil War
138th Rifle Division (Soviet Union) began service as a standard Red Army rifle division
138th Street (IRT Third Avenue Line), station on the demolished IRT Third Avenue Line
138th Street (Manhattan), New York
138th Street – Grand Concourse (IRT Jerome Avenue Line), local station on the IRT Jerome Avenue Line of the New York City Subway
138th Street Bridge, vertical lift bridge carrying the Metro-North Railroad across the Harlem River
Connecticut's 138th assembly district elects one member of the Connecticut House of Representatives
Pennsylvania's 138th Representative District or Pennsylvania House of Representatives, District 138
The Simpsons 138th Episode Spectacular" is the tenth episode of The Simpsons' seventh season
Third Avenue – 138th Street (IRT Pelham Line), express station on the IRT Pelham Line of the New York City Subway

See also
138 (number)
AD 138, the year 138 (CXXXVIII) of the Julian calendar
138 BC